The 2016–17 Cymru Alliance (known as the Huws Gray Cymru Alliance for sponsorship reasons) was the 2016–17 season of the top football league in North Wales. Mirroring its South Wales counterpart the Welsh Football League Division One, the 16-team division forms half of the second tier of the Welsh football league system and falls one level below the nationwide Welsh Premier League. The season began on 12 August 2016 and concluded on 22 April 2017.

On 11 March 2017, Prestatyn Town defeated Gresford Athletic 1–0 to clinch the league title and promotion to the 2017–18 Welsh Premier League.

Teams

Caernarfon Town were champions in the previous season but were ineligible for promotion to the 2016–17 Welsh Premier League; the promotion spot instead passed to runners-up Cefn Druids. No teams in the previous season were relegated from the top-flight into the Cymru Alliance; both Haverfordwest County and Port Talbot Town dropped into the 2016–17 Welsh Football League Division One.

Only the bottom-placed team from the 2015–16 Cymru Alliance, Rhayader Town, were relegated to a third-tier district league for 2016–17, the Mid Wales Football League Division One. Two teams were successful in the 2015–16 Welsh third-tier leagues and were promoted in Rhayader's place: Penrhyncoch and Ruthin Town.

Stadia and locations

League table

Results

References

External links

2016–17 in Welsh football
Cymru Alliance seasons